James King (February 18, 1848 – June 21, 1900) was a Canadian businessman and politician.

Born in Saint-Antoine-de-Tilly, Lower Canada, he received a Bachelor of Arts degree in 1867 and a Master of Arts degree in 1873 from the University of Bishop's College. He joined the family business, King Brothers, which was involved in mining. He was elected to the Legislative Assembly of Quebec in the 1892 election for the riding of Mégantic. A Conservative, he did not run in 1897.

References
 
 

1848 births
1900 deaths
People from Chaudière-Appalaches
Bishop's University alumni
Conservative Party of Quebec MNAs